Sarmiento Department may refer to:

Sarmiento Department, Chubut
Sarmiento Department, San Juan
Sarmiento Department, Santiago del Estero

Department name disambiguation pages

pt:Sarmiento (departamento)